Collegno is a comune (municipality) in the Metropolitan City of Turin in the Italian region Piedmont, located about  west of Turin.

It occupies an alluvial plain at the end of the Val di Susa, between Rivoli and Turin, at the foot of Monte Musinè. The terminal course of the Dora Riparia flows in its territory.

History
Collegno originated as a Roman mansio  from Turin, known as Quintum Collegium (hence the modern name). Ancient findings from the area are now in the Museum of Antiquities in Turin.

Curious Facts
From 3 to 8 July 2017, the sports hall PalaCollegno guested the troops of "Sport Crime", the first ever sport based international TV series, including main characters and sport personalities Daniela Scalia and Luca Tramontin, and other basketball celebrities, like former Italian ace Alessandro Abbio.

International relations

Collegno is twinned with:

 Antony, France
 Sárospatak, Hungary
 Volzhsky, Russia
 Neubrandenburg, Germany
 Cerdanyola del Vallès, Spain
 San Gregorio Magno, Italy
 Oueslatia, Tunisia
 Sarajevo, Bosnia and Herzegovina
 Havířov, Czech Republic
 Rocchetta Sant'Antonio, Italy

See also
Bruneri-Canella case

References

External links

 Official website

Cities and towns in Piedmont
Collegno